Elliot Käck (born 18 September 1989) is a Swedish footballer who plays for Djurgårdens IF as a left back.

Career
Käck started playing football with Djurgårdens IF when he was six years old and stayed with the club throughout his youth career. At the age of 18 he went on loan to fifth tier side Värtans IK and after leaving Djurgården the following year he played for fourth tier club Värmdö IF and then Hammarby Talang FF in the third tier Division 1. In 2012, he switched clubs in the third tier when he moved to IK Sirius where he helped the club win promotion to Superettan.

Käck joined Djurgården from IK Sirius after the 2014 season. He made his Allsvenskan debut on 9 April 2015 in the BK Häcken–Djurgårdens IF 1–1 draw. He spent most of the season being the backup for the left back position but toward the end he became a regular starter.
He made his first Allsvenskan goal on 2 October 2016 in the IFK Norrköping–Djurgårdens IF 1–3 match.

On 8 December 2017 it was announced that Käck would leave Djurgården after three years at the club.

He signed for IK Start in the Eliteserien in December 2017.

Personal life
A Djurgården fan since childhood, as a youngster Käck attended all the club's home games and derbies and stood in the singing section. His father Leif Käck, an A&R man, lyricist and music-business executive since the 1980s, and noted for breaking Orup, is the founder of Roxy Recordings. Elliot has recording music as one of his hobbies.

Honours
Djurgårdens IF
Allsvenskan: 2019

References

External links
 
 Elliot Käck at Eliteprospects

1989 births
Living people
Footballers from Stockholm
Swedish footballers
Association football defenders
IK Sirius Fotboll players
Hammarby Talang FF players
Djurgårdens IF Fotboll players
Värmdö IF players
IK Start players
Allsvenskan players
Superettan players
Eliteserien players
Swedish expatriate footballers
Expatriate footballers in Norway